Dhingana , is a village/ town of Mankera Tehsil, of Bhakkar District, in the Punjab province of Pakistan. It is situated about 280 kilometers west of the city of Lahore.

Bhakkar is located in the west of Punjab. The mighty Indus River flows on the Western side of the District which plays havoc during monsoon season and the Jehlum and Chenab rivers both flow on the eastern side they also sometimes plays havoc during monsoon season. One third of the land is sandy of which small portion is irrigated by Thal canal. Rest of the sandy land is cultivated and is entirely dependent upon rains. People mostly depend on agriculture which is highly dependent on rain. And north side shah wala

Pir Mehr Imam Shah 

Pir Mehr Imam Shah Shrine is located in center of Dhinaga City.  An annual Urs festival celebrated there with great fervour on shrine. People come from far off places to join the celebrations every year.

Transport 
The nearest airport to Dhingana is Dera Ismail Khan  and shah wala garwah bhiradhri  nearest 9 kilometer – travellers used to be able to catch a flight either Lahore, Faisalabad, Multan, Islamabad, Peshawar to this city and then onto Dhingana. These airports are functional for national and international flights, however the other way to get there is by bus. The bus takes 6 hours from Lahore to reach Dhingana and 7 hours from Islamabad and 4 hours from Multan. From Dera Ismail Khan it takes three hours to reach Hyderabad Thall and from Hyderabad it takes a drive of 30 minutes.

The direct bus service is also available from Lahore. Dhingana  is 285 km away from Lahore and it is located on main Lahore-Dera Ismail Khan road.

One can easily get to Dhingana through a fast APV car service from Bharerhi Wala. The distance between Bharerhi and Dhingana only 9km away

References

External links
 Mankera on BigBlueBall
 Map of Mankera
 Wasib | Ancient Riasat Mankera

Populated places in Bhakkar District